Samghabad (also Romanized as Şamghābād) is a village in Ziaran Rural District, in the Central District of Abyek County, Qazvin Province, Iran. At the 2006 census, its population was 139, in 60 families.

References 

Populated places in Abyek County